William Thomas Rogers Jr. (born March 17, 1938) is an American realtor and politician from Maine. He was elected to the 121st Maine State Legislature. He is also ran for the Maine House of Representatives again in 2012.

Affiliations

Rogers is affiliated with the following organizations:

"M" Club University of Maine Board of Directors 
Maine Association of Realtors (State President 1997) 
State Realtor of the year 1988 
University of Maine Black Bear athletic advisors 1982–present 
Corporator in Bangor Savings Bank 
Bangor Salmon Club 
Penobscot County Conservation Association 
Hunter safety instructor (4,000 students) 
Member of the National Rifle Association 
U.S. Army, 101st Airborne division 
Chairman, Black Bear Club, University of Maine

External links
 Maine.gov
 Realty of Maine page
 balletpedia.org

1938 births
Living people
Republican Party members of the Maine House of Representatives
Politicians from Boston
People from Brewer, Maine